Steven Roger Fischer (born 1947) is a New Zealand linguist. He is the former Director of the Institute of Polynesian Languages and Literatures in Auckland, New Zealand. Fischer is the author of more than 150 books and articles on linguistics, many of which are commonly cited. For his contributions to the decipherment of ancient scripts, Fischer was elected a Fellow of the Royal Society of New Zealand in 2010.

Sources
 
 

1947 births
Fellows of the Royal Society of New Zealand
Linguists from New Zealand
Linguists of Polynesian languages
New Zealand non-fiction writers
Living people